Edward Lyman Morris (1870–1913) was an American botanist.

Biography
After secondary education at Monson Academy, Morris enrolled at Amherst College in 1888 and received there a bachelor's degree in 1891. He then spent one year (1891–1892) at the Museum of the Worcester Natural History Society and completed one year (1892–1893) of graduate study at Harvard University. After two years as an assistant in the biological laboratory at Amherst College, he received there an M.A. in 1895. From 1895 to 1896 he was an instructor at Amherst College. From 1896 to 1907 he worked for the public school system of Washington DC, and for the last seven years of his employment there he was the head of the department of biology. From 1907 until his death in 1913 he was the curator of natural science at the Museum of the Brooklyn Institute of Arts and Sciences.

He was a member of several learned societies and the Cosmos Club. He was a founding member and active participant in the Washington Biologists' Field Club.

Morris married twice. His first wife died in 1903. He married again in 1907 and upon his death was survived by his widow and a son.

Selected publications

Honors

Eponyms
 Morris Glacier

Academic honors
 1911 — elected a Fellow of the American Association for the Advancement of Science

References

External links

 

Botanists with author abbreviations
American botanists
Amherst College alumni
Fellows of the American Association for the Advancement of Science
People from Monson, Massachusetts
1870 births
1913 deaths